Tami T (born 1987), formerly known as Tami Tamaki, is a Swedish singer and composer.

Life 
They were born in Gothenburg, Sweden. With their music and art, they constantly blur and redefine the lines of gender and gender identity. They explicitly don't want to define their own gender identity.

Tami T was part of punk bands as a teenager and at the age of 18, they began producing their own music. It wasn't until they moved from Gothenburg to Leipzig, Germany, in 2013, that they started making "glitter electronica" under the name Tami Tamaki. their breakthrough came, when their song I Never Loved This Hard This Fast Before was featured in Ester Martin Bergsmark's 2014 film Something Must Break. Since March 2016, their artist name is shortened to Tami T. The artist is now based in Stockholm.

They released their debut album High Pitched and Moist in 2019 on the label Trannytone Records. Their music also appeared on the Norwegian TV series Skam. They have co-produced the song "A Part of Us" on Fever Ray's 2017 album Plunge and toured with them.

Discography

Studio albums 

 High Pitched and Moist (2019)

References 

21st-century Swedish musicians
Electronic musicians
Transgender singers
1987 births
Living people
Musicians from Gothenburg
Swedish LGBT singers